Old Orange County Courthouse is a historic courthouse building located at Hillsborough, Orange County, North Carolina.  It was built in 1845, and is a two-story, Greek Revival style, temple-form brick structure. It replaced Dickerson Chapel as the county's courthouse. The front facade features a Doric order tetrastyle pedimented portico and two-stage clock tower.  The building served as the seat of Orange County's government until 1954, when a new building was completed.

It was listed on the National Register of Historic Places in 1971.  It is located in the Hillsborough Historic District.

References

External links

Historic American Buildings Survey in North Carolina
County courthouses in North Carolina
Courthouses on the National Register of Historic Places in North Carolina
Government buildings completed in 1845
Hillsborough, North Carolina
Buildings and structures in Orange County, North Carolina
National Register of Historic Places in Orange County, North Carolina
Individually listed contributing properties to historic districts on the National Register in North Carolina